George Kirkpatrick Denton (November 17, 1864 – January 4, 1926) was an American lawyer and politician who served one term as a U.S. Representative from Indiana from 1917 to 1919. He was the father of Winfield K. Denton.

Biography 
Born near Sebree, Kentucky, Denton attended the public schools and Van Horn Institute.
He was graduated from the Ohio Wesleyan University at Delaware in 1891 and from the law department of Boston (Massachusetts) University in 1893.
He was admitted to the bar in 1893 and commenced practice in Evansville, Indiana.
He served as counsel for the Intermediate Life Insurance Co..

Congress 
Denton was elected as a Democrat to the Sixty-fifth Congress (March 4, 1917 – March 3, 1919).
He was an unsuccessful candidate for reelection in 1918 to the Sixty-sixth Congress.

Later career and death 
He resumed the practice of law in Evansville, Indiana.
He was an unsuccessful candidate in 1924 for judge of the Indiana Supreme Court.
Candidate for the Democratic nomination for United States Senator in 1926, but died before the primary election.
He died in Evansville, Indiana, January 4, 1926.
He was interred in Oak Hill Cemetery.

References

1864 births
1926 deaths
Politicians from Evansville, Indiana
Ohio Wesleyan University alumni
Boston University School of Law alumni
Democratic Party members of the United States House of Representatives from Indiana
Burials in Indiana